Willow is an unincorporated community in Jo Daviess County, Illinois, United States. It's area code is 815 and 779.

Notes

Unincorporated communities in Jo Daviess County, Illinois
Unincorporated communities in Illinois